Olaoluwa Akintobi (born November 1946) popularly known as Laolu Akins is a Nigerian music producer who has worked with artists such as Shina Peters, Onyeka Onwenu, Adewale Ayuba, Mike Okri and Christy Essien-Igbokwe. He was the producer of Shina Peter's Ace and Shinamania "Dancing Time" " Experience" albums and Adewale Ayuba's Bubble "Play For Me" and several other albums as well as being the supervising producer of the maiden recording of P-Square titled "Where were you last night" .

Biography

Early career
Laolu Akins acquired basic drums skills at a Lagos City Youth, Sports &Social Centre financed by the then Fed. Min. Of Youth & Sports in Alago Meji- Yaba, Lagos. In his adolescence, he played regularly with a number of friends from high school,in groups like Oscars, Clusters along with the Akinrele Brothers, Seinde Sapara Ade Jolaoso before teaming with Berkley Ike Jones and Mike Gbenga Odumosu. The trio were influenced by British and American rock groups and soul music, Akins joined with colleagues and experimented with rock music. Soon, Akins and his friends combined with the Lijadu Sisters to start a group called Afro-Collection with Tee Mac Iseli. When Ginger Baker moved to Nigeria in 1971, he organized a band, Salt with Laolu Akins as drummer, Salt played in Lagos clubs and later went on a European and American tour with Ginger Baker.

Blo
Upon their return, Laolu co-founded a group called Blo (standing for 'Berkeley, Laolu & Odumosu'), the band recorded some afro-rock songs such as Preacher Man and Native doctor. Blo recorded their first album Chapter One, a psychedelic rock record under EMI label. Sales of the album did not meet EMI's expectations and the band eventually left EMI to record their next album with Decca on their Afrodisia Label. Between 1974 and 1976 the band released three more records, Phase II, Step Three and Phase IV. Odumosu left to join OsibiIn after they recording of Phase II album In summer of 1976, BLO moved over to UK under the management of Cliff Cooper and Velvet Music and was based there till late 1982 when they returned home to Nigeria. On return to Nigeria BLO now with Lemmy Out Jackson as new 'O' of BLO recorded a Maxi single "  Back In Time" However, sales of the album were not encouraging, and after''. Akin traveled to England and learned the craft of music production at Orange Production Centre.

Later life
BLO productions was co-founded by Laolu Akintobi, the business went in to produce records for a number of successful artists such as Christy Essien Igbokwe, Kris Okotie and Onyeka Onwenu.

Between 1989 and 1998, Akins worked with Sony Music Entertainment as A&R controller. He owns a music studio in Ikeja with the name G & A Studio which he now uses as a mentoring pad for upcoming artists and training of young talented producers.

References 

Nigerian record producers
1946 births
Living people